The Flint Fuze were a professional basketball team located in Flint, Michigan, United States, in 2001. They were a part of the Continental Basketball Association and played their home games at the IMA Sports Arena. Former National Basketball Association journeyman Jeff Grayer helped create the franchise and served as the team's initial head coach. After the 2001 season, low attendance forced the Fuze to relocate to Birch Run, Michigan, and become the Great Lakes Storm. After the 2004 season, the franchise folded.

References

Sports in Flint, Michigan
Continental Basketball Association teams
Basketball teams established in 2001
2001 establishments in Michigan
Basketball teams disestablished in 2001
2001 disestablishments in Michigan
Basketball teams in Michigan